Cuspivolva cuspis is a species of sea snail in the family Ovulidae, the ovulids, cowry allies or false cowries.

Description
They have a shaft-like body, propelled by two spheres at one end that stick to the ground so that it may inch along. Its head resembles the top of a mushroom, but is pink with a small hole at the top through which to eat.

References

Ovulidae
Gastropods described in 1973